Fabio Blondus de Montealto or Fabio Biondi (died 6 December 1618) was a Roman Catholic prelate who served as Patriarch of Jerusalem (1588–1618).

Biography
On 8 January 1588, Fabio Blondus de Montealto was appointed by Pope Sixtus V as Patriarch of Jerusalem.
On 17 January 1588, he was consecrated bishop by Scipione Gonzaga, Cardinal-Priest of Santa Maria del Popolo with Giovanni Battista Albani, Patriarch of Alexandria, and Girolamo Bevilacqua, Archbishop of Nazareth, serving as co-consecrators. 
He served as Patriarch of Jerusalem until his death on 6 December 1618.

Episcopal succession

References

External links and additional sources
 (for Chronology of Bishops) 
 (for Chronology of Bishops) 

1618 deaths
17th-century Italian Roman Catholic bishops
Bishops appointed by Pope Sixtus V
Latin Patriarchs of Jerusalem